Guwahati Refinery was set up at Noonmati in Guwahati on 1 January 1962. Guwahati Refinery is the first Public Sector refinery of India and belongs to Indian Oil Corporation Limited. The refinery was inaugurated by Late Pandit Jawahar Lal Nehru, the first Prime Minister of independent India. The refinery was built with Romanian Collaboration and has a capacity of 1.0 million metric tonnes per annum. This refinery process crude oil from Upper Assam Oil Fields, India and helps cater energy need of the region.
Major Products of this refinery are

 LPG,
 Motor Spirit (Petrol),
 Aviation Turbine Fuel (ATF),
 Kerosene,
 High Speed Diesel,
 Light Diesel Oil and
 Raw Petroleum Coke.

With growing environmental consciousness, Guwahati Refinery, Indian Oil Corporation Limited has also ventured into ecologically friendly fuel and subsequently installed 3 new units: the ISOSIV, the Hydrotreater and the INDMAX. The ISOSIV unit produces Lead Free Petrol by the Molecular Sieve Technology, which separates Octane rich MS components from feed naphtha. The Hydrotreater Unit (HDT) enables the Refinery to produce High Speed Diesel of very low sulphur and cetane number conforming to BIS specifications. The HDT also produces ATF, Superior Kerosene Oil with high smoke point and low sulphur. The Indane Maximization (INDMAX) technology developed by R&D Centre of Indian Oil installed at the Refinery is designed to achieve LPG yield as high as 44% through Fluidized Catalytic Cracking of residual feed stocks like Reduced Crude Oil, Coker Fuel Oil and Coker Gasolene. The INDMAX unit also enables Guwahati Refinery to upgrade all its residual products to high value distillate products and make it a zero residue Refinery.

References

Further reading

http://timesofindia.indiatimes.com/articleshow/22979919.cms

Energy in Assam
Oil refineries in India
Economy of Guwahati
Companies based in Assam
Indian Oil Corporation
India–Romania relations
Indian Oil Corporation buildings and structures
1962 establishments in Assam